The 1997–98 NBA season was the Rockets' 31st season in the National Basketball Association, and 27th season in Houston. After a slow 3–5 start to the season, the Rockets went on a nine-game winning streak winning 12 of their first 17 games. The team traveled to Mexico City, Mexico, where they defeated the Dallas Mavericks 108–106 on December 6, 1997, which was the first NBA regular season game played in Mexico. However, as the season progressed, Hakeem Olajuwon went down with a knee injury and only played just 47 games, as the Rockets began to slip under .500, showing their age and the wear and tear of long playoff runs as they played mediocre basketball all season, holding a 22–24 record at the All-Star break. Olajuwon would eventually return as the Rockets finished fourth in the Midwest Division with a 41–41 record, and qualified the playoffs as the #8 seed in the Western Conference.

Clyde Drexler led the team with 18.4 points, 5.5 assists and 1.8 steals per game, while Kevin Willis stepped up in Olajuwon's absence, averaging 16.1 points and 8.4 rebounds per game, Olajuwon provided the team with 16.4 points, 9.8 rebounds, 1.8 steals and 2.0 blocks per game, and Charles Barkley provided with 15.2 points and 11.7 rebounds per game, and played half of the season off the bench as the team's sixth man. In addition, second-year guard and three-point specialist Matt Maloney contributed 8.6 points per game, while Mario Elie and Eddie Johnson both contributed 8.4 points per game each, and three-point specialist Matt Bullard provided with 7.0 points per game.

In the Western Conference First Round of the playoffs, in a rematch of last season's Western Conference Finals, the Rockets took a 2–1 series lead over the top-seeded Utah Jazz. However, in Game 4, Barkley went down with a torn triceps muscle injury in a 93–71 home loss to the Jazz. Without Barkley, the Rockets would lose Game 5 to the Jazz on the road, 84–70, thus losing the series in five games. It was the first time the Rockets lost in the opening round of the playoffs since 1991. The Jazz would go on to lose in six games to the Chicago Bulls in the NBA Finals for the second straight year.

This marked the final season for Drexler, who received a standing ovation after the Rockets' Game 5 loss to the Jazz at the Delta Center. He then retired to take over the head coaching job at the University of Houston, where he had played college basketball along with Olajuwon, ending his fifteen-year career in the NBA. Drexler also won the 2Ball competition along with Cynthia Cooper of the WNBA's Houston Comets during the All-Star Weekend in New York. Also following the season, Willis was traded to the Toronto Raptors, and Elie signed as a free agent with the San Antonio Spurs.

Offseason

Draft picks

Roster

Roster Notes
 Rookie center Serge Zwikker was placed on the inactive list, and never played for the Rockets.

Regular season

Season standings

z – clinched division title
y – clinched division title
x – clinched playoff spot

Record vs. opponents

Game log

Playoffs

|- align="center" bgcolor="#ccffcc"
| 1
| April 23
| @ Utah
| W 103–90
| Clyde Drexler (22)
| Kevin Willis (14)
| Clyde Drexler (6)
| Delta Center19,911
| 1–0
|- align="center" bgcolor="#ffcccc"
| 2
| April 25
| @ Utah
| L 90–105
| Hakeem Olajuwon (16)
| Kevin Willis (12)
| Matt Maloney (6)
| Delta Center19,911
| 1–1
|- align="center" bgcolor="#ccffcc"
| 3
| April 29
| Utah
| W 89–85
| Hakeem Olajuwon (28)
| Hakeem Olajuwon (12)
| Drexler, Maloney (5)
| Compaq Center16,285
| 2–1
|- align="center" bgcolor="#ffcccc"
| 4
| May 1
| Utah
| L 71–93
| Hakeem Olajuwon (27)
| Hakeem Olajuwon (15)
| Clyde Drexler (5)
| Compaq Center16,285
| 2–2
|- align="center" bgcolor="#ffcccc"
| 5
| May 3
| @ Utah
| L 70–84
| Kevin Willis (16)
| Kevin Willis (11)
| three players tied (3)
| Delta Center19,911
| 2–3
|-

Player statistics

NOTE: Please write the players statistics in alphabetical order by last name.

Season

Playoffs

Awards and records

Transactions

References

See also
1997–98 NBA season

Houston Rockets seasons